Andrew Wines (born 3 December 1984) is a Councillor for the Brisbane City Council representing the Enoggera Ward and is Chair of the Infrastructure Committee. He was elected to Brisbane City Council in 2008 and has been returned three subsequent times. Wines was previously Chair of Council for 2019-2021 and served in a range of deputy and whips roles between 2008 and 2019.

Biography 
Wines was born in Camden NSW to a mother and father who were in active army service (both serving 20 years). Andrew is a long-time Northsider, who attend what is today Mt Maria College, Mitchelton. He attended during the spilt campus period across Enoggera and Mitchelton. He holds a Bachelor's Degree in Business majoring in Economics and Marketing from the QUT.

Wines joined the Liberal Party in 2001 (now the LNP) when he was 16 years old and was elected as Councillor for the Enoggera Ward in 2008.

Political career 
Wines was first elected to office in 2008 as part of Campbell Newman's team with a 10% swing towards him becoming both the only non-Labor representative of Enoggera Ward and also the youngest person elected to council (23 years 3 months 2 weeks). Over that term, he was both Whip and Deputy Whip and served as Deputy on the Transport Committee and also on the Planning, Finance, and Communities Committee.

He was re-elected in 2012 on Lord Mayor Graham Quirk's Team with a swing of 14.7% towards him. During this term, he served as Deputy Chair Community Services Committee, Chief Whip, and also served on the Planning and Public Transport Committees.

Wines was re-elected for his third term in 2016 with a 9.4% swing against him, during that term he served as the Deputy of the Public Transport Committee and also served the Environment Committee. In 2019 with the appointment of Adrian Schrinner to the Lord Mayoralty, Wines became Chair of Council (Council's Speaker equivalent).

In 2020 Cr Wines was elected for his fourth term with a 3.2% swing against him as part of Adrian Schrinner's Team and upon re-election was appointed Chair of Council.  Cr Wines chaired the meeting where Council authorised formally pursuing the 2032 Olympics.

With the expansion of the Civic Cabinet due to the successful Olympic bid, he was appointed Chair of the Infrastructure Committee. The Infrastructure Committee has oversight over major and minor road projects, bridge constructions, traffic operations, asset management, drainage, and footpaths. The current major project is the Moggill Rd corridor upgrade, Beams Rd upgrades, Kelvin Grove/Enoggera Rd corridor upgrade, and the Story Bridge maintenance and upgrade.

References

People from Brisbane
Living people
Queensland University of Technology alumni
Liberal Party of Australia politicians
Politicians from Brisbane
1984 births